Puiseux is the remnant of a lunar impact crater that has been almost completely submerged by lava. It was named after French astronomer Pierre Puiseux. It is located near the southern end of Mare Humorum, to the north east of the ruined crater Doppelmayer. To the south-southeast is Vitello. Of the original structure of Puiseux, only the upper part of the rim remains above the mare surface. There are some small craterlets within the interior floor.

Satellite craters
By convention these features are identified on lunar maps by placing the letter on the side of the crater midpoint that is closest to Puiseux.

References

 
 
 
 
 
 
 
 
 
 
 

Impact craters on the Moon